The Bally Hooley Steam Railway is a  narrow gauge heritage railway operating in Port Douglas, Queensland, Australia.

It operates a 4 km line from the Marina Station, located at Crystalbrook Superyacht Marina, to St. Crispins Station and takes approximately 1 hour for a return trip.

The service operates on Sundays and days that cruise ships are in town, but is closed on public holidays. Most Sundays, one of the steam locomotives is operated. The steam locomotives are "Speedy", "Bundy" or "Nelson". "Bundy" has a special coal car.

External links
 Bally Hooley Steam Railway official site

2 ft gauge railways in Australia
Heritage railways in Australia
Tourist railways in Queensland